Hugh Gough, 3rd Viscount Gough  (27 August 1849 – 14 October 1919), he was educated at Brasenose College, Oxford (MA).

In June 1901, Lord Gough was appointed British Minister Resident at the Court of the Kingdom of Saxony and the Duchy of Saxe-Coburg-Gotha, and Chargé d'affaires at the Court of Principality of Waldeck.

On 5 October 1889, he married Lady Georgina Pakenham (born 1 September 1863; died 30 July 1943), the elder daughter of 4th Earl of Longford, GCB.

References

 Burke's Peerage, 105th edition
 Who Was Who

External links
 

1849 births
1919 deaths
Alumni of Brasenose College, Oxford
Knights Commander of the Royal Victorian Order
3
Deputy Lieutenants of Galway